The Barking Abbey Basketball Academy is an elite 16–19 basketball academy, based at Barking Abbey School in London, England.

History
The school established the basketball academy in 2005, after recognising the lack of elite development opportunities for young players in Britain.  Almost unique in British basketball and more similar in structure to a European-style system, the full-time academy is a leading developer of young British talent, many of whom go on to further develop in the NCAA or European academies.   

The academy hosted the Nike Junior Euroleague Invitational Tournament in 2010, and was named as the first Great Britain Regional Institute of Basketball in 2011.

Men's team
As of the 2019–20 season the men's team compete as Barking Abbey in NBL Division 1, the second tier of British men's basketball. 

From 2010–2012, the academy partnered with NBL Division 1 side Essex Leopards, representing as the BA London Leopards. The joint venture was triumphant in winning the Division 1 league, National Cup and playoffs titles in 2012. Following the end of this partnership, the academy entered a team in its own right in 2012, competing in Division 4. In 2014, the academy partnered with the Medway Park Crusaders, competing as the Kent Crusaders in Division 1.

Women's team
The women's team compete, in partnership with the London Lions, as the London Lions in the WBBL, the top tier of British women's basketball.

Academy teams
The academy was a founding member of the Elite Academies Basketball League (EABL) and Women's Elite Basketball League (WEABL). 

The men's team won the inaugural Elite League in 2014, defeating Bristol-based SGS College 76–74 in the final.  Abbey next won the title in 2017, and defended their title in 2018, defeating Charnwood and Myerscough. 

The men's will compete in the 2019–20 Euroleague Next Generation Tournament, the highest junior basketball competition in Europe.

Men's season-by-season records

See also
London Lions (women)

References

Sport in the London Borough of Barking and Dagenham
Basketball teams in London
Barking, London
2005 establishments in England
Basketball teams established in 2005
Basketball teams in England